Rouen (or ) is a city on the River Seine in northern France. It is the prefecture of the region of Normandy and the department of Seine-Maritime. Formerly one of the largest and most prosperous cities of medieval Europe, the population of the metropolitan area is 702,945 (2018). People from Rouen are known as Rouennais.

Rouen was the seat of the Exchequer of Normandy during the Middle Ages. It was one of the capitals of the Anglo-Norman dynasties, which ruled both England and large parts of modern France from the 11th to the 15th centuries. From the 13th century onwards, the city experienced a remarkable economic boom, thanks in particular to the development of textile factories and river trade. Claimed by both the French and the English during the Hundred Years' War, it was on its soil that Joan of Arc was tried and burned alive on 30 May 1431. Severely damaged by the wave of bombing in 1944, it nevertheless regained its economic dynamism in the post-war period thanks to its industrial sites and its large seaport, which today is the fifth largest in France.

Endowed with a prestige established during the medieval era, and with a long architectural heritage in its historical monuments, Rouen is an important cultural capital. Several renowned establishments are located here, such as the Museum of Fine Arts, the Secq des Tournelles museum, and Rouen Cathedral.

Seat of an archdiocese, it also hosts a court of appeal and a university. Every four to six years, Rouen becomes the showcase for a large gathering of sailing ships called "L'Armada"; this event makes the city an occasional capital of the maritime world.

History

Rouen was founded by the Gaulish tribe of the Veliocasses, who controlled a large area in the lower Seine valley. They called it Ratumacos; the Romans called it Rotomagus. It was considered the second city of Gallia Lugdunensis after Lugdunum (Lyon) itself. Under the reorganization of Diocletian, Rouen was the chief city of the divided province Gallia Lugdunensis II and reached the apogee of its Roman development, with an amphitheatre and thermae of which foundations remain. In the 5th century, it became the seat of a bishopric and later a capital of Merovingian Neustria.

From their first incursion into the lower valley of the Seine in 841, the Normans overran Rouen.  From 912, Rouen was the capital of the Duchy of Normandy and residence of the local dukes, until William the Conqueror moved his residence to Caen. In 1150, Rouen received its founding charter which permitted self-government.

During the 12th century, Rouen was the site of a yeshiva known as La Maison Sublime. Discovered in 1976, it is now a museum. At that time, about 6,000 Jews lived in the town, comprising about 20% of the population.

On 24 June 1204, King Philip II Augustus of France entered Rouen and definitively annexed Normandy to the French Kingdom. He demolished the Norman castle and replaced it with his own, the Château Bouvreuil, built on the site of the Gallo-Roman amphitheatre. A textile industry developed based on wool imported from England, for which the cities of Flanders and Brabant were constantly competitors, and finding its market in the Champagne fairs. Rouen also depended for its prosperity on the river traffic of the Seine, on which it enjoyed a monopoly that reached as far upstream as Paris.

In the 13th and 14th centuries urban strife threatened the city: in 1291, the mayor was assassinated and noble residences in the city were pillaged. Philip IV reimposed order and suppressed the city's charter and the lucrative monopoly on river traffic, but he was quite willing to allow the Rouennais to repurchase their old liberties in 1294. In 1306, he decided to expel the Jewish community of Rouen, then numbering some five or six thousand. In 1389, another urban revolt of the underclass occurred, the Harelle. It was suppressed with the withdrawal of Rouen's charter and river-traffic privileges once more.

During the Hundred Years' War, on 19 January 1419, Rouen surrendered to Henry V of England, who annexed Normandy once again to the Plantagenet domains but Rouen did not go quietly: Alain Blanchard hanged English prisoners from the walls, for which he was summarily executed while Canon and Vicar General of Rouen Robert de Livet became a hero for excommunicating the English king, resulting in de Livet's imprisonment for five years in England. Joan of Arc, who supported a return to French rule, was burned at the stake on 30 May 1431 in this city, where most inhabitants supported the duke of Burgundy, the French king's enemy. The king of France, Charles VII, recaptured the town in 1449.

Rouen was staunchly Catholic during the French Wars of Religion, and underwent an unsuccessful five-month siege in 1591/2 by the Protestant King Henry IV of France and an English force commanded by the Earl of Essex.
A brief account by an English participant has survived. See 'Memoirs of Robert Carey', (F.H.Mares (ed.), Oxford, 1972), pp. 18–21.

The first competitive motor race ran from Paris to Rouen in 1894.

During the German occupation in World War II, the Kriegsmarine had its headquarters located in a chateau on what is now the Rouen Business School. The city was heavily damaged during the same war on D-day, and its famed cathedral was almost destroyed by Allied bombs.

Main sights

Rouen is known for its Rouen Cathedral, with its Tour de Beurre (butter tower) financed by the sale of indulgences for the consumption of butter during Lent. The cathedral's gothic façade (completed in the 16th century) was the subject of a series of paintings by Claude Monet, some of which are exhibited in the Musée d'Orsay in Paris.

The Gros Horloge is an astronomical clock dating back to the 14th century. It is located in the Gros Horloge street.

Other famous structures include Rouen Castle, whose keep is known as the tour Jeanne d'Arc, where Joan of Arc was brought in 1431 to be threatened with torture (contrary to popular belief, she was not imprisoned there but in the since destroyed tour de lady Pucelle); the Church of Saint Ouen (12th–15th century); the Palais de Justice, which was once the seat of the Parlement (French court of law) of Normandy; the Gothic Church of St Maclou (15th century); and the Museum of Fine Arts and Ceramics which contains a splendid collection of faïence and porcelain for which Rouen was renowned during the 16th to 18th centuries. Rouen is also noted for its surviving half-timbered buildings.

There are many museums in Rouen: the Musée des Beaux-Arts de Rouen, an art museum with pictures of well-known painters such as Claude Monet and Géricault; the Musée maritime fluvial et portuaire, a museum on the history of the port of Rouen and navigation; Musée des antiquités, an art and history museum with local works from the Bronze Age through the Renaissance, the Musée de la céramique and the Musée Le Secq des Tournelles.

The Jardin des Plantes de Rouen is a notable botanical garden once owned by Scottish banker John Law, dating from 1840 in its present form. It was the site of Élisa Garnerin's parachute jump from a balloon in 1817. There is also a park and garden at the Champs de Mars, to the east of the city centre. The Paris–Rouen motor race of 1894, Le Petit Journal Horseless Carriages Contest, ended at the Champs de Mars.

In the centre of the Place du Vieux Marché (the site of Joan of Arc's pyre) is the modern church of St Joan of Arc. This is a large, modern structure which dominates the square. The form of the building represents an upturned viking boat and a fish shape.

Rouen was also home to the French Grand Prix, hosting the race at the nearby Rouen-Les-Essarts track sporadically between 1952 and 1968. In 1999 Rouen authorities demolished the grandstands and other remnants of Rouen's racing past. Today, little remains beyond the public roads that formed the circuit.

Rouen has an opera house, whose formal name is "Rouen Normandy Opera House – Theatre of Arts" (in French: Opéra de Rouen Normandie – Théâtre des arts).

Climate
Rouen has an oceanic climate (Cfb in the Köppen climate classification).

Transport

Mainline trains operate from Gare de Rouen-Rive-Droite to Le Havre and Paris, and regional trains to Caen, Dieppe and other local destinations in Normandy. Daily direct trains operate to Amiens and Lille, and direct TGVs (high-speed trains) connect daily with Lyon and Marseille.

City transportation in Rouen consists of a tram and a bus system. The tramway branches into two lines out of a tunnel under the city centre. Rouen is also served by TEOR (Transport Est-Ouest Rouennais) and by buses run in conjunction with the tramway by TCAR (Transports en commun de l'agglomération rouennaise), a subsidiary of Transdev.

Rouen has its own airport.

The Seine is a major axis for maritime cargo links in the Port of Rouen. The Cross-Channel ferry ports of Caen, Le Havre, Dieppe (50 minutes) and Calais, and the Channel Tunnel are within easy driving distance (two and a half hours or less).

Administration
Rouen and its metropolitan area of 70 suburban communes form the Métropole Rouen Normandie, with 494,382 inhabitants at the 2010 census. In descending order of population, the largest of these suburbs are Sotteville-lès-Rouen, Saint-Étienne-du-Rouvray, Le Grand-Quevilly, Le Petit-Quevilly, and Mont-Saint-Aignan, each with a population exceeding 20,000.

Population

Education
The main schools of higher education are the University of Rouen and NEOMA Business School (former École Supérieure de Commerce de Rouen), Unilasalle (agronomy and agriculture), both located at nearby Mont-Saint-Aignan, and the INSA Rouen, ESIGELEC, ESITech and the CESI, the three at nearby Saint-Étienne-du-Rouvray.

Culture
The main opera company in Rouen is the Opéra de Rouen – Normandie. The company performs in the Théâtre des Arts, 7 rue du Docteur Rambert. The company presents opera, classical and other types of music, both vocal and instrumental, as well as dance performances. Every five years, the city hosts the large maritime exposition, L'Armada.

The city is represented by Quevilly-Rouen football club, currently in Ligue 2.  Officially called Union Sportive Quevillaise-Rouen Métropole, the club play at the 12.018 capacity Stade Robert Diochon in nearby Le Petit-Quevilly.  Rouen Normandie Rugby represent the city in Rugby Union.  One of few professional rugby teams from northern France, Rouen Normandie Rugby, currently play in the second-tier Pro D2. Dragons de Rouen, an ice hockey club, play in the top-tier Ligue Magnus at the Île Lacroix arena.  Baseball is also played in the city at Stade Saint Exupéry.  The local team, Huskies de Rouen play in the top French tier, they also play some games in European competition.

Notable residents

Rouen was the birthplace of:
 Edward IV (1442–1483), King of England.
 Elizabeth of York, Duchess of Suffolk (1444-c1503), sister of Edward IV, married John de la Pole, Plantagenet.
  (b. 1500s), explorer
  (1507–1569), poet
 François de Civille (1537–1610), military commander
 Isaac Oliver (1556–1617), French-born English painter.
 Guy de la Brosse (1586–1641), botanist and pharmacist
 Antoine Girard de Saint-Amant (1594–1661), poet.
 Samuel Bochart (1599–1667), Protestant theologian.
 Pierre Corneille (1606–1684), tragedian.
 Guillaume Couture (1617–1701), lay missionary and diplomat
 Adrien Auzout (1622–1691), astronomer
 Thomas Corneille (1625–1709), dramatist, brother of Pierre Corneille.
 Noel Alexandre (1639–1724), theologian and ecclesiastical historian.
 Robert Hubert (c.1640-1666), executed in England for falsely confessing to starting the Great Fire of London
 Marie Champmeslé (1642–1698), actress.
 René-Robert Cavelier, Sieur de La Salle (1643–1687), explorer.
 Jean Jouvenet (ca.1644–1717), painter of religious subjects.
 Nicolas Lemery (1645–1715), chemist.
 Pierre Le Pesant, sieur de Boisguilbert (1646–1714) economist and lawmaker.
 Gabriel Daniel (1649–1728), Jesuit historian.
 Anne Mauduit de Fatouville (mid 17th C – 1715), playwright
 Jean Jouvenet (1647–1717), painter.
  (1652–1721), Catholic writer
 Jacques Basnages (1653–1723), Protestant theologian.
 Bernard le Bovier de Fontenelle (1657–1757), author, nephew of Pierre Corneille.
 François Raguenet (1660–1722), historian, biographer and musicologist
 Pierre Antoine Motteux (1663–1718), French-born English dramatist.
 Pierre Dangicourt (1664–1727), mathematician
 François Blouet de Camilly (1664–1723), Catholic Archbishop
 Jean-Laurent Le Cerf de La Viéville (1674–1707), musicographer
 Pierre François le Courayer (1681–1776), theologian.
 François d'Agincourt (1684–1758), composer
 Jean II Restout (1692–1768), painter.
 Louise Levesque (1703–1745), playwright, poet
 Jacques-François Blondel (1705–1774), architect.
 Marie-Madeleine Hachard (1708–1760), nun and abbess
 Jeanne-Marie Leprince de Beaumont (1711–1780), novelist
 Jacques Duphly (1715–1789), composer
 Pierre-Antoine Guéroult (1749–1816), scholar
 Charles Boulanger de Boisfremont (1773-1838), painter
 François-Adrien Boïeldieu (1775–1834), composer.
 Pierre Louis Dulong (1785–1838), physicist and chemist.
 Théodore Géricault (1791–1824), painter.
 Armand Carrel (1800–1836), writer.
 Jean-Amédée Méreaux (1802–1874), musicologist, pianist and composer 
 Pierre Adolphe Chéruel (1809–1891), historian.
 Alphonse Maille (1813–1865) botanist
 Gustave Flaubert (1821–1880), novelist.
 Joseph-Henri Altès (1826–1895), flautist and pedagog
 Eugène Ketterer (1831–1870), composer
 Eugène Caron (1834–1903), opera singer
 Maurice Leblanc (1864–1941), novelist
 Charles Nicolle (1866–1936), bacteriologist
 Léon de Saint-Réquier (1872–1964), organist and composer
 Georges Guillain (1876–1961), neurologist
 Robert Antoine Pinchon (1886–1943), painter
 Marcel Dupré (1886–1971), composer
 Marcel Duchamp (1887–1968), artist
 Philippe Étancelin (1896–1981), race car driver
 Armand Salacrou (1899–1989), dramatist
 Roger Apéry (1916–1994), mathematician
 Jean Lecanuet (1920–1993), politician
 Jacques Rivette (1928–2016), film director
 Jean-Yves Lechevallier (b. 1946), sculptor
 Anny Duperey (b. 1947), actress and novelist
 Dominique Lokoli (b. 1952), footballer
 François Hollande (b. 1954), 24th President of the French Republic
 Hubert Wulfranc (b. 1956), Member of Parliament
 Élise Lucet (b. 1963), journalist
 Stéphan Caron (b. 1966), swimmer
 Karin Viard (b. 1966), actress
 Céline Minard (b. 1969), writer
 Frédéric Cissokho (b. 1971), former professional footballer
 Christophe Mendy (b. 1971), boxer
 David Trezeguet (b. 1977), footballer
 Thomas Pesquet (b. 1978), astronaut
 Nathalie Péchalat (b. 1983), ice dancer
 Ian Mahinmi (b. 1986), basketball player
 Fayçal Fajr (b. 1988), footballer
 Benjamin Police (b. 1988), professional footballer
 Amaury Vassili (b. 1989), singer
 Alexis Gougeard (b. 1993), cyclist
 Pierre Gasly (b. 1996), Formula One driver
 Petit Biscuit (b. 1999), music producer
 Aurélien Tchouaméni (b. 2000), footballer
 Théo Maledon (b. 2001), basketball player
 Lola Lovinfosse (b. 2005), racing driver

International relations

Rouen is twinned with:
  Baton Rouge, Louisiana, United States, since 1963
  Hannover, Germany, since 1966
  Norwich, Norfolk, England, United Kingdom, since 1959
  Cleveland, Ohio, United States, since 2008
  Pomeranian Voivodeship, Poland, since 1992
  Salerno, Campania, Italy, since 2002
  Zhejiang, China, since 1990

Sculpture
During the second half of the 20th century, several sculptures by Jean-Yves Lechevallier were erected in the city.
Inaugurated in 2010, the Rouen Impressionnée hosted the contemporary urban (re)development installation sculpture 'Camille' by Belgian artist Arne Quinze. Quinze's use of interlocking systems in sculpture employ wood, concrete, paint and metal. The Quasi-Quinze method of sculpture utilizes structural integrity and randomness as key elements for 'Camille'. Located on the Boieldieu Bridge in the center of Rouen, this intentional location was chosen by the artist to magnify the historical separation of its city's citizens.

Representations in art

Rouen Cathedral is the subject of a series of paintings by the Impressionist painter Claude Monet, who painted the same scene at different times of the day. Two paintings are in the National Gallery of Art in Washington, D.C.; two are in the Pushkin Museum of Fine Arts in Moscow; one is in the National Museum of Serbia in Belgrade. The estimated value of one painting is over $40 million.

Heraldry

See also
 Archbishopric of Rouen
 Jean-Marie Baumel, sculptor of two of the statues on the Pont Boieldieu in Rouen
 Ouen, a Catholic saint
 The works of Maxime Real del Sarte

References

External links

  
 Rouen Tourist Board 

 
Communes of Seine-Maritime
Viking Age populated places
Prefectures in France
Veliocasses
Gallia Lugdunensis
Normandy region articles needing translation from French Wikipedia
Cities in France